FNK may refer to:
 Friday Night Kiss, a British house music project
 Kosovo Swimming Federation